is a Japanese composer and musician who has written several classical works for saxophone.

Life
Born in Amagasaki, Japan, in 1948, Noda has been hailed throughout the Western hemisphere for his perfect control, powerful avant-garde improvisations and innovative playing techniques. While he is a leading exponent of new Japanese music for the saxophone, his repertoire also includes Western music of the baroque, classical, and romantic periods. Noda graduated from the Osaka College of Music as a saxophonist. He pursued advanced music studies at Northwestern University (Illinois) under Fred L. Hemke and at the Bordeaux Conservatory (France) under Jean-Marie Londeix. He was twice awarded the Osaka City Art Festival Prize and in 1986 he won the Osaka Prefecture Gold Award. Noda also received the Grand Prix of the Yamaha Electone Festival in 1989, and his work as a composer was again recognized in 1973 when he was awarded the SACEM Composition Prize.

Famous works
Noda is famous for various saxophone compositions, including:
 Improvisation I, II, & III (based on shakuhachi playing)
 Mai, Paris 1975 for solo saxophone
 Phoenix
 Gen
 Requiem (Shin Én) for solo saxophone
 Murasaki No Fuchi for saxophone duet (AA or ST)

References 

1948 births
Conservatoire de Bordeaux alumni
Japanese composers
Japanese male composers
Living people
People from Amagasaki